The National Direction of Police Intelligence (DNIP) manages the National Police of Panama, to produce strategic and operational intelligence; knowledge of threats, challenges, worries, criminality and the social demands, to orient the taking of decisions in front of the factors of perturbation of the public order, the security and the defence, by part of the controls and the government.

This direction is independent of the Direction of Judicial Investigation (D.I.J. ).

Direction Police Information 

Before the creation of the DNIP the police were managed by the Direction Police Information (DIP) This direction to the same work that the National Direction of Police Intelligence (DNIP).

Organization 

 Department of Security of Airports
 Section Antinarcóticos
 Unit of Rooms Body Scan
 Unit of Rooms of Reconciliation
 Security of the Traveller
 Department of Analysis
 Department of Operations
 Department of Intelligence
 Department of Counterintelligence

Law enforcement in Panama